Ctenucha reimoseri is a moth of the family Erebidae. It is found in Paraguay.

References

reimoseri
Moths described in 1912